Edwin Francis Lyford (September 8, 1857 – October 15, 1929) was an American lawyer and politician who served on the Springfield, Massachusetts city council, as a member of the Massachusetts House of Representatives and in the Massachusetts State Senate.

Early life
Lyford was born on September 8, 1857 in Waterville, Maine to Moses and Mary L. (Dyer) Lyford.

Education
Lyford attended the Coburn Classical Institute and Colby University, from which he graduated with an A.B. degree in 1877, and a M.A. in 1882.

Early career
After he graduated from Colby University, Lyford worked in the Waterville, Maine law offices of Hon. Reuben Foster.  
Lyford also worked as a teacher while he lived in Waterville, teaching in the local schools and at Colby University.  Lyford was admitted to the Maine Bar in 1879.  In 1882 Lyford moved to Springfield and was admitted to the Massachusetts Bar in that year.

Springfield city council
Lyford was a member of the Springfield city council for two years in 1885 and 1886.

Massachusetts legislature

Massachusetts House of Representatives
In 1892-1893 Lyford represented the Seventh Hampden District  in the Massachusetts House of Representatives.  In the House of 1892 Lyford was the Clerk of Committee on Cities and the Chairman of House Committee on Probate and Insolvency.  Lyford was also on the Committee on Constitutional Amendments in the House of 1893.  Lyford was the Chairman of Special Committee to investigate the Bay State Gas Company.

Massachusetts Senate
In 1894 Lyford served in the Massachusetts State Senate representing the First Hampden District.  While in the Senate, Lyford was the Chairman of committee on probate and insolvency, and on the committees on judiciary and taxation, and special committee on revision of corporation laws, also chairman of the special committee on the unemployed, 1894.

Death
Lyford died at his home in Springfield on October 15, 1929.

References

1857 births
1929 deaths
Colby College alumni
Massachusetts lawyers
Republican Party members of the Massachusetts House of Representatives
Republican Party Massachusetts state senators
Politicians from Waterville, Maine
Springfield, Massachusetts City Council members
19th-century American lawyers